Fazaia Medical College (FMC) is a private sector medical college located in Islamabad, Pakistan. The medical college is a constituent college of Air University, Islamabad. It was founded by Pakistan Air Force along with Fazaia Ruth Pfau Medical College for undergraduate medical education & training.

History 
College was originally established on 16, March 2015 and was inaugurated in December, 2015 with the start of first academic year of the college. College is located in the premises of Air University in the secure and scenic environment of PAF Complex and Margala foothills. The college is built on atrium concept of architecture to ensure conducive and congenial environment for education. The college has highly qualified and well experienced faculty.

Programs 
The FMC college offers undergraduate programs of MBBS at its attached teaching hospital.

Faculty 
The college has four main faculties:
 Faculty of Basic Science
 Faculty of Clinical Science
 Faculty of Medical Education
 Faculty of Clinical Skills and Simulation

References 

Medical colleges in Islamabad
Pakistan Air Force